László Szászfalvi (born 11 January 1961) is a Hungarian Calvinist pastor, theologian and politician, Member of Parliament for Marcali from 1998 to 2014, then for Barcs since 2014. He served as Secretary of State for Churches, Minorities and Civil Affairs between 2010 and 2012. He also served as mayor of Csurgó from 1990 to 2003 and from 2006 to 2010.

References

1961 births
Living people
Hungarian Calvinist and Reformed theologians
Hungarian Democratic Forum politicians
Fidesz politicians
Members of the National Assembly of Hungary (1998–2002)
Members of the National Assembly of Hungary (2002–2006)
Members of the National Assembly of Hungary (2006–2010)
Members of the National Assembly of Hungary (2010–2014)
Members of the National Assembly of Hungary (2014–2018)
Members of the National Assembly of Hungary (2018–2022)
Members of the National Assembly of Hungary (2022–2026)
People from Makó
Mayors of places in Hungary